Panchanan Ghoshal (1 June 1908 — 19 January 1990) was a Bengali writer, criminologist and social worker.

Career
Ghoshal was born in a Zaminder family of Naihati, Presently in North 24 Parganas in British India. He passed M.Sc. in Zoology and Ph.D. in Psychology. Criminology was his special paper. While Ghoshal served in Jorasanko police station, Rabindranath Tagore inspired him to write on the subject of crime and criminals. He retired as Deputy Inspector General from Indian Imperial Police service. He was first Indian to be awarded a doctorate degree in Criminal psychology

Literary works
Ghoshal's first short story Nicher Samaj was published in Kollol Magazine. He became lecturer of Calcutta University and guest lecturer of many institution and universities all over the India.  He wrote many articles, novels and books in Bengali, Hindi, Oria and English in criminology and criminal psychology. His most notable contribution is Aparadhbiggan in 8 volumes explaining cause and effect of crime in society as well as mentality of criminals and their reformation. Ghoshal was one of the pioneer of Indian crime literature.  His others books are:

 Police Bahini
 Shramik Biggan
 Hindu Pranibiggan
 Aporadh Tadonto
 Kishore Oporadhi
 Ami Jokhon Police Chilam
 Bikhyato Bichar O Tadanta Kahini
 Roktonodir Dhara
 Andhokarer Desh
 Khoon Ranga Ratri
 Ami Jader Dekhechi
 Amar Dekha Meyera
 Pocketmar
 Ekti Advut Mamla
 Odhoston Prithibi
 Nagarir Avishap
 Jagroto Bharat
 Ekaṭi Narī Hatyā
 Ekaṭi Nirmama Hatyā

Social works
Ghoshal established residential schools, model girls school, library, medical center at Madral village near Naihati. He founded a school in red light area of Kolkata for the education of children of prostitute. He also established reformatory school, agricultural firm and industrial training center. He donated his personal collections in Crime museum in India. Ghoshal was the founder editor of Kolkata Police journal.

References

1908 births
1990 deaths
Bengali writers
Indian criminologists
Criminology educators
Indian crime fiction writers
University of Calcutta alumni
Academic staff of the University of Calcutta
Indian social sciences writers
Bengali Hindus
Indian reformers
Writers from Kolkata
Scholars from West Bengal